Nyainrong County is a small county under the administration of the prefecture-level city of Nagqu, in the north of the Tibet Autonomous Region, bordering Qinghai province to the north. Yurla is a favourite of the people of the county.

References

Counties of Tibet
Nagqu